The Sihlianska Plateau is a plateau in the Vepor Mountains of Slovakia. It is named after the municipality of Sihla.

Villages
 Sihla
 Lom nad Rimavicou
 Drábsko
 Detvianska Huta

Mountain ranges of Slovakia
Western Carpathians